The Perfumed Garden was the title given by John Peel to his 1967 late-night programme on the British pirate radio station, Radio London.

History

London After Midnight
After several years of work in US commercial pop radio, Peel joined the station in March 1967, on returning to the UK from California. As well as various slots on Radio London's usual three-hour daytime shows, he was allotted the midnight to 2 a.m. programme, then called London After Midnight. 

His experience of the Los Angeles music scene had made him more aware than most of his colleagues of the dramatic changes taking place in pop music in 1966-7. These were accompanied by significant changes in 1960s youth culture, with the fashion-led teenage consumerism of the mid-1960s Swinging London era being challenged by the more reflective, less materialistic outlook of the San Francisco hippies. Peel, having had first-hand experience of the emerging hippy scene - he had seen many of the new bands and performers in California - found himself in the right place at the right time, with a parallel movement developing in London under the influence of the Beatles. The period saw the emergence of the underground papers International Times and Oz, and of music venues such as the UFO club.  He was intent on reflecting the emerging new directions in his programmes and, within the existing Radio London framework, adapted his playlists accordingly.

The Perfumed Garden
The Perfumed Garden began quietly, in May 1967; the name-change (which had nothing to do with the celebrated erotic book, he maintained) occurred when Peel realised that no one else on the station was listening to its late-night programmes, the after-midnight slot being unpopular with DJs and advertisers alike. 

Departing from the station's heavily commercial "Fab 40" playlist, Peel began broadcasting a mixture of folk, blues, psychedelic and progressive rock tracks that he happened to like, announcing them in a shy, laconic drawl which contrasted sharply with the fast-talking, upbeat presentation of most pirate radio disc-jockeys. The first the Radio London management knew of his programme was when it began to gather glowing reviews in the music press - and when the station's London office received an appreciative letter from The Beatles' manager Brian Epstein. 

The Perfumed Garden also attracted a remarkable audience response, appealing to a specific segment of the British pop music audience - often school, college and university students whose cultural horizons had been broadened by the new educational opportunities of the 1960s. This audience was ready for a more varied musical and cultural diet than that provided by commercial pop pirate radio, most of which was still aimed at housewives and younger teenagers. Peel's listeners sent in letters and poems very much in the spirit of the times, and with a strong sense of identification with what The Perfumed Garden represented; for many, the programme was an introduction to the music and beliefs of the flower power era. 

Peel continued his show until anti-pirate legislation forced the station to close in August 1967. While it is questionable whether he would have been allowed such freedom had Radio London's closedown not been imminent, the station allowed him an extra hour's broadcasting (from midnight to 3 a.m.) in its final week, and the final Perfumed Garden, on 14 August 1967, lasted all night, from midnight to 5.30 a.m. Peel's emotional farewell, in which he assured his listeners of his love and promised that the Perfumed Garden would return "in some form", was evidence of the close bond he had established with his audience. Indeed, he soon began a regular Perfumed Garden column in the London underground newspaper International Times; while some keen listeners organised a Perfumed Garden listeners' group to keep the spirit of the programme alive.

BBC Radio 1
With many other ex-pirate radio DJs, Peel was snapped up by BBC Radio 1, when it began broadcasting in autumn 1967. He was not universally popular, his outlook and musical tastes being at variance with the station's chart-based ethos; but with the support of some influential producers and BBC managers he was eventually able to establish himself. Much to the chagrin of his rivals, Peel frequently won DJ popularity polls in the music press - due to the loyalty of his committed listeners. 

His early BBC programmes, being restricted to two or three hours per week, were less free and personal than the Perfumed Garden; listener input, in particular, was greatly reduced,  but its influence was still apparent in Peel's presentation style and in his musical choices. The 1968-69 Night Ride programmes incorporated poetry, guests, and world music from the BBC archives as well as a wide range of music, from rock, folk and blues to occasional classical and avant-garde pieces. They can be seen as a development of the Perfumed Garden idea, especially in their spoken word content (on his Radio London shows, Peel had regularly featured the work of the Liverpool poets alongside music tracks and listeners' letters), and also as a British equivalent of late-1960s underground American FM radio; but Peel's Night Ride did not attract support from the BBC management. Peel and his guests incurred their displeasure by making a number of controversial statements, and it was taken off after 18 months. However, Night Ride can be seen in retrospect as well ahead of its time, its eclectic musical content foreshadowing programmes such as BBC Radio 3's Late Junction, which only began thirty years later.

Legacy
The Perfumed Garden served as a model for many other UK radio rock shows of the late 1960s and early 1970s. Its influence can be heard, for example, in the early BBC programmes of Bob Harris, and in the late-night shows of Hugh Nolan and Terry Yason on Radio Geronimo (broadcasting from Radio Monte Carlo at weekends in 1969-70). During the hippy era, many DJs tried to imitate Peel's gentle monotone, although none could match his flair for language, or his ability to surprise his listeners.

Although the more whimsical side of the Perfumed Garden - the fascination with sparrows, hamsters and other small creatures, his sympathy for the childlike fantasies expressed in some listeners' letters - caused Peel some embarrassment in his later years, the social concern which accompanied his hippie idealism remained constant throughout his career. (On the Perfumed Garden programme, he publicised Peace News as well as the underground papers Oz and International Times). Time and again he championed the underdog and lent his support to unfashionable or difficult performers. 

He continued to broadcast in a similar, uniquely personal style until his death in 2004, encompassing more than thirty years of changing fashions in pop music — and completely ignoring convention. Unlike other DJs, he did not remain preoccupied with the music of his youth, and he rejected opportunities to branch out into television, show business or arts broadcasting. He remained loyal to Radio One, constantly in search of new musical styles, and committed to a young audience - a commitment which determined the course of his career, and which can be traced back directly to the imaginary community he created through the Perfumed Garden.

The BBC presenter, Bob Harris, said the show was unlike any other in its format.
"Broadcasting ‘…in my stoned solitude from the middle of the North Sea …' John Peel suddenly arrived in my life with a mixture of records, poetry, letters and conversation. The format was diverse, the content an absolute revelation. The show was called The Perfumed Garden. Even the name was exotic. I could hardly believe what I was hearing.

It was instantly clear to me that this was a programme that was stepping way outside of the usual boundaries of playlists and format. The airwaves literally crackled with the sounds of a new generation of music…Captain Beefheart, Quicksilver Messenger Service, Love, the Doors, the Incredible String Band. Whoever this person was, I wanted to be him. I wanted to press a button and be there in that studio, finding this amazing stuff, getting these incredible letters from people who were feeling the same way as me and broadcasting it all for as many people as would listen. At that moment I knew that this was my way forward and that I had to stick by this feeling. That it really was possible to go on air, go out on a limb and just play the music you really loved, with no compromise."

Tribute broadcast
In 2006, as part of a John Peel tribute marking the second anniversary of his death, BBC Radio 6 Music broadcast four half-hour excerpts from his final Perfumed Garden show from 23–27 October. These recordings are part of a "reconstructed" version of the complete show. The best available off-air recordings of the programme have been edited together and digitally cleaned up (although the sound quality is still very tinny), and the musical items have been replaced with CD or LP versions.

References

External links
BBC 6Music: Keeping it Peel: What Was The Perfumed Garden?
An Audio Tribute to the late John Peel Comments about and even copies of Peel Sessions
BBC Radio 1 tribute web site.

Bibliography
Robert Chapman: Selling the Sixties (London 1992), pp.122-131 (describes and discusses The Perfumed Garden, within the context of 1960s pirate radio history)
On the programme's effect on its listeners, see: Monni (Aldous): What is The Perfumed Garden? In: Gandalf's Garden, Issue 2, August 1968. Reprinted (in edited form) in: John Peel with Sheila Ravenscroft, Margrave of the Marshes, London 2005, p. 242

British music radio programmes
1967 radio programme debuts
John Peel